Dracaena forbesii, synonym Pleomele forbesii, (Waianae Range hala pepe or Forbes' dracaena) is a species of flowering plant that is endemic to the island of Oahu in Hawaii. It is threatened by habitat loss.

References

External links
 World Conservation Monitoring Centre 1998.  Pleomele forbesii.   2006 IUCN Red List of Threatened Species.   Downloaded on 23 August 2007.

forbesii
Endemic flora of Hawaii
Biota of Oahu
Trees of Hawaii
Plants described in 1932
Taxonomy articles created by Polbot